"Don't Say Goodbye" is a song written by Stock Aitken Waterman for Astley's multi-million-selling debut album Whenever You Need Somebody (1987). Although the song was considered for worldwide release, it was only released in the Italian market in late 1988.

Track listing
Italian vinyl single
 "Don't Say Goodbye" (Latin Rascal's Remix) – 7:15
 "My Arms Keep Missing You" (PWL House Mix)
 "Rick Astley House Megamix"

References

Rick Astley songs
Songs written by Mike Stock (musician)
Songs written by Matt Aitken
Songs written by Pete Waterman
1988 singles
1987 songs
Song recordings produced by Stock Aitken Waterman
RCA Records singles